Everts is Dutch surname.  

Notable people with the name include:

 Clint Everts (born 1984), American professional baseball player
 Harry Everts (born 1952), Belgian motocross racer
 Kellie Everts (born 1945), American stripper, bodybuilder, founder of a church
 Sabine Everts (born 1961), German heptathlete
 Sheri Everts, American academic 
 Stefan Everts (born 1972), Belgian motocross racer
 Truman C. Everts (1816–1901), American explorer

Dutch-language surnames
Patronymic surnames
Surnames from given names